Hessenstein is a mountain of Bavaria, Germany. The nearest town is Klingenbrunn, Germany.

Mountains of Bavaria